Cornelius Johannes Theodoor Uphof (1886–1969 ) was a botanist, phycologist, and teacher. Born in the Netherlands, he worked extensively in the University of Arizona, at Tucson.

He was known for initiating the controversy over the taxonomy of Hippeastrum.

Publications
1959. Dictionary of economic plants. Ed. H. R. Engelmann (J. Cramer); Hafner. 400 pp. 2nd. ed. 1968, 591 pp.

References

External links

Jstor

American botanists
1886 births
1969 deaths